The Swell Head (also known as The Swelled Head and Eddie Foy, Jr., with Bessie Love in The Swelled Head) is a 1928 American romantic musical short starring Eddie Foy Jr. and Bessie Love, directed by Foy's brother Bryan. Variety mused that "this may be the first backstage sound short."

The film is preserved at the UCLA Film and Television Archive.

Plot 

A young man (Foy) and woman (Love) perform a vaudeville act multiple times a day. The young man's ego makes their collaboration difficult. When he is made aware of this, he changes his ways, and the pair fall in love.

Cast 
 Eddie Foy Jr.
 Bessie Love
 Eugene Pallette
 Claude Sanders
 James T. Mack

Soundtrack 
 "Cielito Lindo"
 "The Skaters' Waltz"
 "Turkey in the Straw"
 "Espanito"
 "Spring Song"

Production 

A plagiarism lawsuit was filed against the studio.

Release and reception 

Though it was a short film, because it was a sound film, it headlined at some theaters. The film had its New York premiere at the Strand Theatre.

Foy and Love received high praise for their performances, and the film left open the possibility for sequel shorts.

References 
Citations

Works cited

External links 
 
 Photo of Eddie Foy Jr. and Bessie Love

1928 films
1920s romantic musical films
American black-and-white films
American romantic musical films
Films about musical theatre
Films directed by Bryan Foy
Vitaphone short films
1920s American films
1920s English-language films